Events from the year 1888 in Denmark.

Incumbents
 Monarch – Christian IX
 Prime minister – J. B. S. Estrup

Events

Undated

 The Nordic Exhibition of 1888 took place in Copenhagen.

Culture

Music
 5 February  First public performance of Carl Nielsen's String Quartet No. 1 in the smaller hall of the Odd Fellows Mansion in Copenhagen.

Births
 15 March – Sophus Nielsen, footballer (died 1963)
 30 March – Einar Utzon-Frank, sculptor (died 1955)
 26 April – Olaf Henriksen, Major League baseball player (died 1962)
 15 July – Svend Bille, actor (died 1973)
 28 July – Adam Fischer, sculptor (died 1968)
 12 August – Prince Axel of Denmark (died 1964)
 15 December – Kaare Klint, architect (died 1954)
 16 December – Ivan Joseph Martin Osiier, olympic athlete (died 1965)

Deaths
 29 February – Wilhelm Sponneck, nobleman and politician, Danish finance minister (born 1815)
 8 August – Jørgen Roed, painter (born 1808)
 14 August – Carl Christian Hall, politician, Danish prime minister (born 1812)

References

 
1880s in Denmark
Denmark
Years of the 19th century in Denmark